Batesville is an unincorporated community in eastern Butler County, in the U.S. state of Missouri. The community is located in the flatlands of southeast Missouri on Missouri Route 51 between Broseley to the south and Rossville to the north.

History
A post office called Batesville was established in 1902, and remained in operation until 1910. The community was named after Horace Bates, owner of the site.

References

Unincorporated communities in Butler County, Missouri
Unincorporated communities in Missouri